Mongolia competed at the 1992 Summer Olympics in Barcelona, Spain. 33 competitors, 27 men and 6 women, took part in 31 events in 8 sports.

Medalists

Competitors
The following is the list of number of competitors in the Games.

Archery

In the fifth time they competed in archery at the Olympics, Mongolia entered only one woman.  She lost in the first round of elimination.

Women's Individual Competition:
 Jargal Otgon — Round of 32, 17th place (0-1)

Athletics

Men's Marathon
 Pyambuugiin Tuul — 4:00.44 (→ 87th place)

Boxing

Men's Light Flyweight (– 48 kg)
 Erdenentsogt Tsogtjargal
 First Round – Defeated Fernando Retayud (COL), 8:2   
 Second Round – Lost to Rogelio Marcelo (CUB), 2:14

Cycling

Four male cyclists represented Mongolia in 1992.

Men's road race
 Jamsran Ulzii-Orshikh
 Dashjamtsyn Mönkhbat
 Dashnyamyn Tömör-Ochir

Men's team time trial
 Zundui Naran
 Dashnyamyn Tömör-Ochir
 Jamsran Ulzii-Orshikh
 Dashjamtsyn Mönkhbat

Judo

Shooting

Weightlifting

Wrestling

References

External links
Official Olympic Reports
International Olympic Committee results database

Nations at the 1992 Summer Olympics
1992
1992 in Mongolian sport